Herning Cykle Klub (or Herning CK) is an amateur road bicycle racing club, located in Herning, Denmark, and founded April 11, 1937 on initiative by E.V.Johansen, with Poul Schmidt as chairman.  

A number of the best Danish professional riders, including 1996 Tour de France winner Bjarne Riis, come from Herning CK, and the professional UCI ProTour team Team CSC was created from the elite team of Herning CK.

External links
 Official site

CSC
Cycling teams established in 1937
Sport in Herning
1937 establishments in Denmark